Elections for Zila Parishads and Panchayat samiti were held on 7 February 2012. Municipal elections were held across various cities in Maharashtra, India on 16 February. In different cities elections results were mixed by party. The capital, Mumbai, resulted in a plurality for the Shiv Sena and the second largest city of Pune resulted in a Nationalist Congress Party plurality.

Rules
According to the Election Commission of India's rules the day before, day of and day after the elections were a dry day in the jurisdictions that held elections.

Parties
The parties that took part in the municipal elections were:

Results
The results by municipality were:
Brihanmumbai Mahanagar Palika

Pune Municipal Corporation

Nagpur Municipal Corporation

Thane Municipal Corporation 

Pimpri-Chinchwad Municipal Corporation 

Nashik Municipal Corporation 

Solapur Municipal Corporation 

Amravati Municipal Corporation  

Ulhasnagar Municipal Corporation 

Akola Municipal Corporation

References
 

Local elections in Maharashtra
2012 elections in India
February 2012 events in India